Giuseppe Maria Doria Pamphili (born 11 November 1751 in Genoa, the capital of the Republic of Genoa – died on 8 February 1816 in Rome) was an Italian cardinal of the Catholic Church who served as Cardinal Secretary of State.

Biography
Giuseppe Maria Doria Pamphili is part of the illustrious family of the Counts of Melfi and the Doria-Pamphilj family, which includes many cardinals. Giuseppe Pamphili was the brother of Cardinal Antonio Maria Doria Pamphili and the uncle of Cardinal Giorgio Doria Pamphili. He was appointed the titualar archbishop of Seleucia in February 1773 at the age of 21, while not yet a priest. He was ordained bishop in July and August. In September, he was appointed apostolic nuncio in France, a position he held until 1785.

He had an epistular exchange with Benjamin Franklin. In some of those letters, Franklin declared his availability to accept a French priest, chosen by the Papacy, to be sent in America in order to manage all the spiritual affairs pertaining the Roman Catholics who wish to establish themselves within the United States. The French priest had the faculty to appoint a suffragan American as his collaborator.

Pope Pius VI created him cardinal during the Papal Consistory of 14 February 1785. He served as Cardinal Secretary of State of the Holy See from 1797 to 1799.

In 1799 he was arrested by the French and deported to Genoa. Cardinal Doria Pamphili was then appointed by Napoleon in 1813 as an intermediary to negotiate the Concordat of Fontainebleau.

Giuseppe Doria Pamphili participated in the conclave of 1799–1800 during which Pius VII was elected pope.

Episcopal lineage 

Doria Pamphili's episcopal lineage or apostolic succession was:
 Cardinal Scipione Rebiba
 Cardinal Giulio Antonio Santorio (1566)
 Cardinal Girolamo Bernerio, OP  (1586)
 Archbishop Galeazzo Sanvitale (1604)
 Cardinal Ludovico Ludovisi (1621)
 Cardinal Luigi Caetani (1622)
 Cardinal Ulderico Carpegna (1630)
 Cardinal Paluzzo Paluzzi Altieri degli Albertoni (1666)
 Pope Benedict XIII (1675)
 Pope Benedict XIV (1724)
 Archbishop Enrico Enríquez (1743)
 Bishop Manuel Quintano Bonifaz (1749)
 Cardinal Buenaventura Fernández de Córdoba Spínola (1761)
 Giuseppe Maria Cardinal Doria Pamphilj

See also

Citations

Sources

Renata Ago, Carriere e clientele nella Roma barocca, Roma-Bari, Laterza, 1990.
Cardinals of the Catholic Church

1816 deaths
18th-century Italian cardinals
Cardinal Secretaries of State
1751 births
Clergy from Genoa
Cardinals created by Pope Pius VI
19th-century Italian cardinals